The following highways are numbered 956:

United States

Canada
Saskatchewan Highway 956